The 2014–15 HC Slovan Bratislava season has been the 3rd season for Bratislava based club in Kontinental Hockey League. Slovan started the season with a series of three wins, which was the best start since Slovan joined KHL. Then, after a series of three games without a win the head coach Rostislav Čada asked for release from his contract, which was accepted by Slovan's executives. In the following home game against CSKA Moscow the team was led by Vladimír Országh, former assistant coach. On September 23 it was announced that a Finnish coach Petri Matikainen would lead Slovan until the end of this season.

Schedule and results

Pre-season
Pre-season schedule was announced on June 16, 2014.

|- style="background:#d0e7ff;"
|1||July 22|| Metallurg Novokuznetsk||2 – 3 OT||Slovan Bratislava||Tipsport Arena, Liberec||N/A||
|- style="background:#fbb;"
|2||August 1|| Dinamo Minsk||6–0||Slovan Bratislava||Buly Arena Kravaře||N/A||
|- style="background:#dfd;"
|3||August 6|| HC Košice||1–3||Slovan Bratislava||Steel Aréna||8,347||
|- style="background:#fbb;"
|4||August 8||Slovan Bratislava||1–2||Amur Khabarovsk ||Slovnaft Arena||7,339||
|- style="background:#fea;"
|5||August 14|| Vityaz Podolsk||3 – 2 SO||Slovan Bratislava||Centro Sportivo, Bellinzona||N/A|| 
|- style="background:#d0e7ff;"
|6||August 16|| HC Lugano||2 – 3 SO||Slovan Bratislava||Pista La Resega||~ 3,000||
|- style="background:#d0e7ff;"
|7||August 17|| CSKA Moscow||2 – 3 OT||Slovan Bratislava||Sportzentrum Herisau||N/A||
|- style="background:#dfd;"
|8||August 22||  HC '05 Banská Bystrica ||1–4|| Slovan Bratislava ||Aréna Brezno||~ 3,000||
|- style="background:#d0e7ff;"
|9||August 26|| Kometa Brno||2 – 3 SO|| Slovan Bratislava||Kajot Arena||6,744||
|- style="background:#fea;"
|10|| August 28 || Slovan Bratislava || 1 – 2 OT || HC Vítkovice  || Slovnaft Arena || 4,544 || 
|-

|-
| style="text-align:center;"|

Notes

Regular season

|- style="background:#dfd;"
|1||4||Slovan Bratislava||5–2||Medveščak Zagreb ||Slovnaft Arena || 10,055 ||1–0–0–0||
|- style="background:#dfd;"
|2||6||Metallurg Magnitogorsk||2–3||Slovan Bratislava||Magnitogorsk Arena||6,614 || 2–0–0–0||
|- style="background:#dfd;"
|3||8||Avtomobilist Yekaterinburg||1–3||Slovan Bratislava||KRK Uralets|| 2,500 ||3–0–0–0|| 
|- style="background:#fbb;"
|4||10||Ak Bars Kazan|| 4–3 ||Slovan Bratislava||TatNeft Arena||6,248 || 3–0–0–1 ||
|- style="background:#fea;"
|5||14||Slovan Bratislava|| 2 – 3 SO ||Torpedo Nizhny Novgorod||Slovnaft Arena|| 10,055||3–0–1–1||
|- style="background:#fbb;"
|6||16||Slovan Bratislava|| 0–3||Severstal Cherepovets||Slovnaft Arena||8,832||3–0–1–2||
|- style="background:#fbb;"
|7||20||Slovan Bratislava||1–4||CSKA Moscow||Slovnaft Arena||10,055||3–0–1–3 ||
|- style="background:#fbb;"
|8||24||Slovan Bratislava||1–4||Medveščak Zagreb ||Slovnaft Arena||7,985||3–0–1–4||
|- style="background:#dfd;"
|9||26|| Medveščak Zagreb||1–3||Slovan Bratislava||Dom Sportova||5,800||4–0–1–4||
|- style="background:#d0e7ff;"
|10||29||Slovan Bratislava||3 – 2 SO||Dinamo Minsk ||Slovnaft Arena||8,025||4–1–1–4||
|-

|- style="background:#dfd;"
|11||1||Slovan Bratislava||5–1||Dinamo Riga ||Slovnaft Arena||8,611||5–1–1–4||
|- style="background:#fbb;"
|12||6||SKA Saint Petersburg|| 7–2 ||Slovan Bratislava||Ice Palace||11,589||5–1–1–5||
|- style="background:#dfd;"
|13||8|| Dinamo Riga||1–4||Slovan Bratislava||Arena Riga||3,550||6–1–1–5||
|- style="background:#fbb;"
|14||10|| Dinamo Minsk|| 4–1 ||Slovan Bratislava||Minsk-Arena||14,755||6–1–1–6||
|- style="background:#fbb;"
|15||12||Slovan Bratislava||2–4||Jokerit Helsinki ||Slovnaft Arena||10,055||6–1–1–7||
|- style="background:#fbb;"
|16||14|| Medveščak Zagreb|| 1–0 ||Slovan Bratislava||Dom Sportova ||5,500||6–1–1–8||
|- style="background:#fbb;"
|17||18||Traktor Chelyabinsk||3–2 ||Slovan Bratislava||Traktor Sport Palace ||5,700|| 6–1–1–9||
|- style="background:#d0e7ff;"
|18||20||Yugra Khanty-Mansiysk|| 3 – 4 SO ||Slovan Bratislava||Arena Ugra || 2,250 ||6–2–1–9||
|- style="background:#dfd;"
|19||22||Neftekhimik Nizhnekamsk||1–3||Slovan Bratislava||SCC Arena ||3,800|| 7–2–1–9||
|- style="background:#dfd;"
|20||24||Lada Togliatti||3–6||Slovan Bratislava||Lada Arena||5,432||8–2–1–9|| 
|- style="background:#fbb;"
|21||30||Slovan Bratislava||2–3||Sibir Novosibirsk||Slovnaft Arena||9,681||8–2–1–10||
|- style="background:#fbb;"
|22||31||Slovan Bratislava||1–3||Amur Khabarovsk||Slovnaft Arena||9,619||8–2–1–11||
|-

|- style="background:#dfd;"
|23||2||Slovan Bratislava||4–1||Admiral Vladivostok||Slovnaft Arena||8,902||9–2–1–11||
|- style="background:#fea;"
|24||5||Sibir Novosibirsk||1 – 0 SO||Slovan Bratislava||Ice Sports Palace Sibir||5,500||9–2–2–11||
|- style="background:#fbb;"
|25||7|| Barys Astana||6–1||Slovan Bratislava||Kazakhstan Sports Palace||4,011||9–2–2–12||
|- style="background:#fea;"
|26||12||Slovan Bratislava||1 – 2 SO||Medveščak Zagreb ||Slovnaft Arena||8,728|| 9–2–3–12|| 
|- style="background:#fbb;"
|27||16|| Jokerit Helsinki||2–1||Slovan Bratislava||Hartwall Arena||9,319||9–2–3–13||
|- style="background:#dfd;"
|28||18||Atlant Mytishchi|| 1–2 ||Slovan Bratislava||Mytishchi Arena||5,800||10–2–3–13||
|- style="background:#fea;"
|29||20|| Dinamo Riga||1 – 0 SO||Slovan Bratislava||Arena Riga||3,480||10–2–4–13||
|- style="background:#fbb;"
|30||25||Slovan Bratislava||1–3||Lokomotiv Yaroslavl||Slovnaft Arena ||9,135||10–2–4–14||
|- style="background:#fbb;"
|31||27||Slovan Bratislava||0–2||Vityaz Podolsk||Slovnaft Arena ||7,719||10–2–4–15||
|- style="background:#d0e7ff;"
|32||29||Slovan Bratislava||2 – 1 SO||Atlant Mytishchi||Slovnaft Arena ||10,055||10–3–4–15||
|-

|- style="background:#dfd;"
|33||1||Slovan Bratislava||5–0||Metallurg Novokuznetsk||Slovnaft Arena||7,441||11–3–4–15||
|- style="background:#fbb;"
|34||3||HC Sochi||4–1||Slovan Bratislava||Bolshoy Ice Dome||6,537||11–3–4–16||
|- style="background:#fbb;"
|35||5||Dynamo Moscow||7–2||Slovan Bratislava||Minor Arena||4,672||11–3–4–17||
|- style="background:#fbb;"
|36||8||Slovan Bratislava||3–5||Avangard Omsk||Slovnaft Arena||7,504||11–3–4–18||
|- style="background:#dfd;"
|37||10||Slovan Bratislava||3–2||Barys Astana ||Slovnaft Arena||7,240||12–3–4–18||
|- style="background:#d0e7ff;"
|38||12||Slovan Bratislava||3 – 2 SO||Salavat Yulaev Ufa||Slovnaft Arena||8,739||12–4–4–18||
|- style="background:#dfd;"
|39||15||Slovan Bratislava||6–2||Jokerit Helsinki ||Slovnaft Arena||9,058||13–4–4–18||
|- style="background:#fea;"
|40||22||Slovan Bratislava||2 – 3 SO||Lada Togliatti||Slovnaft Arena||10,055||13–4–5–18||
|- style="background:#fbb;"
|41||24||Slovan Bratislava||4–6||Neftekhimik Nizhnekamsk||Slovnaft Arena||10,055||13–4–5–19||
|- style="background:#fbb;"
|42||26||Slovan Bratislava||1–6||SKA Saint Petersburg||Slovnaft Arena||10,055||13–4–5–20||
|-

|- style="background:#fbb;"
|43||4|| Medveščak Zagreb||5–4||Slovan Bratislava||Dom Sportova||5,754||13–4–5–21||
|- style="background:#fea;"
|44||8|| Dinamo Minsk||3 – 2 SO||Slovan Bratislava||Minsk-Arena||15,086||13–4–6–21||
|- style="background:#dfd;"
|45||10||Lokomotiv Yaroslavl||0–2||Slovan Bratislava||Arena 2000||9,015||14–4–6–21||
|- style="background:#fea;"
|46||12||Vityaz Podolsk||2 – 1 OT||Slovan Bratislava||Podolsk Hero Arena||1,500||14–4–7–21||
|- style="background:#fbb;"
|47||15||Slovan Bratislava||3–5||HC Sochi||Slovnaft Arena||8,784||14–4–7–22||
|- style="background:#ffbbb2;"
|48||17||Slovan Bratislava||0–2||Dynamo Moscow||Slovnaft Arena||10,055||14–4–7–23||
|- style="background:#fbb;"
|49||20||Slovan Bratislava||4–6||Dinamo Minsk ||Slovnaft Arena||7,856||14–4–7–24||
|- style="background:#fbb;"
|50||22||Slovan Bratislava||4–5||Atlant Mytishchi||Slovnaft Arena||7,574||14–4–7–25||
|- style="background:#d0e7ff;"
|51||28||SKA Saint Petersburg||1 – 2 SO||Slovan Bratislava||Ice Palace||12,192||14–5–7–25||
|- style="background:#fbb;"
|52||30|| Jokerit Helsinki||4–0||Slovan Bratislava||Hartwall Arena||12,472||14–5–7–26||
|-

|- style="background:#fbb;"
|53||1|| Dinamo Riga||6–0||Slovan Bratislava||Arena Riga||6,270||14–5–7–27||
|- style="background:#fbb;"
|54||3||Atlant Mytishchi||3–4||Slovan Bratislava||Mytishchi Arena||4,700||14–5–7–28||
|- style="background:#fbb;"
|55||11||CSKA Moscow||12–0||Slovan Bratislava||CSKA Ice Palace||3,547||14–5–7–29||
|- style="background:#fbb;"
|56||13||Torpedo Nizhny Novgorod||3–1||Slovan Bratislava||Trade Union Sport Palace||5,550||14–5–7–30||
|- style="background:#fbb;"
|57||15||Severstal Cherepovets||4–2||Slovan Bratislava||Ice Palace||4,182||14–5–7–31||
|- style="background:#fbb;"
|58||18||Slovan Bratislava||3–4||Dinamo Riga ||Slovnaft Arena||7,307||14–5–7–32||
|- style="background:#dfd;"
|59||22||Slovan Bratislava||5–2||SKA Saint Petersburg||Slovnaft Arena||9,954||15–5–7–32||
|- style="background:#fea;"
|60||24||Slovan Bratislava||2 – 3 OT||Jokerit Helsinki ||Slovnaft Arena||10,055||15–5–8–32||
|-

|-
| style="text-align:center;"|

Detailed records

Standings
Source: khl.ru
After games of October 26, 2014

Bobrov Division

Western Conference

*– Division leader;
BOB – Bobrov Division, TAR – Tarasov Division

Player statistics

Source:

Skaters

Goaltenders

Team statistics
All statistics are for regular season only.

Notes

Source:

Roster
Source: hcslovan.skSource: eliteprospects.com
Source: khl.ru
As of February 1, 2015

|}

Roster changes

Players Joining

Players Leaving

Player signings
This is the list of all players that extended their contracts with HC Slovan Bratislava:

Players lost via retirement

Draft picks
Slovan's picks at the 2014 KHL Junior Draft in Saint Petersburg.

See also
HC Slovan Bratislava all-time KHL record
List of HC Slovan Bratislava seasons

References

HC Slovan Bratislava seasons
Bratislava
Bratislava